The Algarve Cup is an invitational tournament for national teams in women's association football hosted by the Portuguese Football Federation (FPF). Held annually in the Algarve region of Portugal since 1994, it is one of the most prestigious and longest-running women's international football events and has been nicknamed the "Mini FIFA Women's World Cup".

The most successful teams have been the United States, with ten titles, followed by Norway and Sweden with five, and Germany with four. The USA has won all its titles since 2000, including nine in thirteen years since 2003. China has won twice. The USA, Norway and Germany are the only nations to have won both the FIFA Women's World Cup and the Algarve Cup.

The Algarve Cup, as an annual event featuring most of the world's top women's football teams, has no parallel in the men's game, given that there are fewer professional women's leagues and thus fewer scheduling conflicts. It is played in late February or early March, at the same time as the Arnold Clark Cup, the Cup of Nations, the Cyprus Women's Cup, the Istria Cup, the Pinatar Cup, the SheBelieves Cup, the Tournoi de France, the Turkish Women's Cup and the Women's Revelations Cup.

Format

From 2002 to 2014, 12 teams were invited, with the top eight competing for the championship. The teams were divided into three groups of four — A, B and C. Group C was added in 2002 to provide second-tier teams with high-level match experience every year. The teams first played round-robin within their pool. Then the placement round proceeded as follows:
11th place: The two bottom teams in Group C played one game.
9th place: The Group C runner-up played one game against the lower-ranked of the fourth-place teams from Groups A and B.
7th place: The Group C winner played one game against the higher-ranked of the fourth-place teams from Groups A and B.
5th place: The third-place teams from Groups A and B played one game.
3rd place: The second-place teams from Groups A and B played one game.
1st place: The first-place teams from Groups A and B played one game.

In 2015, Group C teams became eligible for the final, which is now played between the two best group winners. If teams are tied on points, finishing positions will be determined by the following tie-breaking criteria in the following order:
 number of points obtained in the matches among the teams in question
 goal difference in all the group matches
 number of goals scored in all the group matches
 fair-play ranking in all the group matches
 FIFA ranking
The placement round is now as follows:
11th place match: 3rd best 4th placed team vs. 2nd best 4th placed team
9th place match: best 4th placed team vs. 3rd best 3rd placed team
7th place match: 2nd best 3rd placed team vs. best 3rd placed team
5th place match: 3rd best 2nd placed team vs. 2nd best 2nd placed team
3rd place match: 3rd best group winner vs. best 2nd placed team
Final: Best group winner vs. 2nd best group winner

Results

Teams reaching the top four

Medals

 Share gold in 2018 Algarve Cup.

Participating nations

Statistics

Teams

 Source:

Individuals

References

External links
 Official website, FPF.pt (only in Portuguese)
 Algarve Cup on WomensSoccerUnited.com
 RSSSF.com history page, with links to full results
 Full results and history
 FPF – Algarve Cup match results 1994–2015

 
Sport in Albufeira
International association football competitions in Europe
International association football competitions hosted by Portugal
Sport in Algarve
Recurring sporting events established in 1994
International women's association football invitational tournaments
1994 establishments in Portugal
February sporting events
March sporting events